Lecania is a genus of lichenized fungi in the family Ramalinaceae. The genus was circumscribed by Abramo Bartolommeo Massalongo in 1853. Lecania is widely distributed, especially in temperate regions, and contains about 64 species.

Species

Lecania arizonica 
Lecania atrynoides 
Lecania azorica 
Lecania baeomma 
Lecania belgica 
Lecania brattiae 
Lecania caloplacicola 
Lecania chalcophila 
Lecania chirisanensis 
Lecania chlaronoides 
Lecania circumpallescens 
Lecania coeruleorubella 
Lecania coerulescens 
Lecania coreana 
Lecania croatica 
Lecania cuprea 
Lecania cyrtella 
Lecania cyrtellina 
Lecania dubitans 
Lecania erysibe 
Lecania euphorbiae 
Lecania fabacea 
Lecania franciscana 
Lecania fructigena 
Lecania fuscella 
Lecania fuscelloides 
Lecania glauca 
Lecania graminum 
Lecania granulata 
Lecania heardensis 
Lecania hutchinsiae 
Lecania hydrophobica 
Lecania inundata 
Lecania johnstonii 
Lecania juniperi 
Lecania leprosa 
Lecania madida 
Lecania makarevicziae 
Lecania maritima 
Lecania molliuscula 
Lecania muelleriana 
Lecania naegelii 
Lecania nigra 
Lecania nylanderiana 
Lecania olivacella 
Lecania pacifica 
Lecania poeltii 
Lecania polycarpa 
Lecania polycycla 
Lecania rabenhorstii 
Lecania rinodinoides 
Lecania ryaniana 
Lecania sanguinolenta 
Lecania sessilisoraliata 
Lecania sipmanii 
Lecania sordida 
Lecania spadicea 
Lecania suavis 
Lecania subfuscula 
Lecania sylvestris 
Lecania triseptatoides 
Lecania turicensis 
Lecania vermispora  – Falkland Islands

References

Ramalinaceae
Lichen genera
Lecanorales genera
Taxa described in 1853
Taxa named by Abramo Bartolommeo Massalongo